Julien Berthomier (born 10 April 1990) is a French professional footballer who plays as a defender for Championnat National 3 club Villefranche Saint-Jean Beaulieu.

Club career
Born in Grasse, Berthomier began his career with RC Grasse and signed in 2001 with Cannet Rocheville. In the summer of 2004, he joined Cannes. In Cannes, Berthomier played for three years before being transferred to Nice.

International career
Berthomier has played for France at under-15 and under-16 level.

References

Living people
1990 births
Footballers from Provence-Alpes-Côte d'Azur
Association football defenders
French footballers
RC Grasse players
ES Cannet Rocheville players
AS Cannes players
OGC Nice players
FC Gueugnon players
Red Star F.C. players
Francs Borains players
Ligue 1 players
Championnat National players
Championnat National 3 players
Challenger Pro League players
French expatriate footballers
Expatriate footballers in Belgium
French expatriate sportspeople in Belgium

France youth international footballers
Sportspeople from Alpes-Maritimes
People from Grasse